Bianca Elena Harabagiu (née: Tiron; born 31 May 1995 in Iași) is a Romanian handballer who plays for SCM Gloria Buzău (women's handball).

References

External links
 Profile on Liga Profesionistă de Handbal din România
 

1995 births
Living people
Sportspeople from Iași
Romanian female handball players